Phosphocholine is an intermediate in the synthesis of phosphatidylcholine in tissues.  Phosphocholine is made in a reaction, catalyzed by choline kinase, that converts ATP and choline into phosphocholine and ADP.   Phosphocholine is a molecule found, for example, in lecithin.

In nematodes and human placentas, phosphocholine is selectively attached to other proteins as a posttranslational modification to suppress an immune response by their hosts.

It is also one of the binding targets of C-reactive protein (CRP).  Thus, when a cell is damaged, CRP binds to phosphocholine, beginning the recognition and phagocytotic immunologic response.

Phosphocholine is a natural constituent of hens' eggs (and many other eggs) often used in biomimetic membrane studies.

See also
 Alkylphosphocholines
 Choline
 Phosphoethanolamine

References

External links
Phosphocholine 3D Structure Viewer

Post-translational modification
Quaternary ammonium compounds
Organophosphates
Zwitterions